Ekaterina Mikhailovna Schulmann (born 19 August 1978) is a Russian political scientist specializing in legislative processes. Schulmann is an associate professor of the RANEPA, an associate professor of the Moscow School for the Social and Economic Sciences, and an associate fellow of Chatham House.

She works as a lecturer and columnist, gives expert commentary to the media, and hosts her own political radio talk show. As of August 2022, her YouTube channel has one million subscribers.

Biography

Education and career 
Schulmann was born in Tula to Michael and Olga Zaslavsky. Michael Zaslavsky had a Ph.D. in Engineering and worked as vice-rector at the Tula Institute of Economics and Informatics. Professor Olga Zaslavsky is Head of the Department of Theoretical and Practical Pedagogics at the TSPU.

In 1995, Ekaterina graduated with honors from public school №73 and went to Canada, where in 1996 she graduated from George Brown College in Toronto. In 1999 she moved to Moscow, where In March–September 1999 she was a senior editor at Russian News and Information Agency Novosti. Later in 1999, she started working at the State Duma, staying there in various posts (deputy’s assistant, political faction analyst and expert in the analytical department) until 2011.

In 2001-2005, she studied political science at the RANEPA (Russian Presidential Academy of National Economy and Public Administration).

In 2006-11, Schulmann was Director of legislative research at The PBN Company, a consulting firm.

In 2013, she obtained a Candidate of Sciences degree in political science at RANEPA and was hired by the Russian Presidential Academy of National Economy and Public Administration. Her research interests include the legislative process in modern Russia, parliamentarism and decision-making mechanisms in hybrid political regimes. From 2013 until its closure Schulmann was a lecturer in the Moscow School of Civic Education.

In 2013, she became an associate professor at the Russian Presidential Academy of National Economy and Public Administration.

In 2018, she was elected a member of the Presidential Council for Civil Society and Human Rights. On 21 October 2019, she was dismissed from the Council.

In 2019, she was promoted to Director of RANEPA's Center for Legislative Studies and started working as associate professor at MSSES.

Since January 2023, Ekaterina Shulman has become a professor at Kazakh University KAZGUU named after M.Narikbayev, she will teach political science at the university.

Media projects 

Since 2013, Schulmann has written as a columnist or a commentator for Vedomosti, The New Times, Colta.ru, .

In 2016, she launched her Youtube channel, dedicated to lawmaking and politics. Soon she accumulated a wide audience of all ages, including teenagers. Memes and citations with Schulmann became viral in RuNet, TikTok, etc.

In 2017, she started her own show ‘Status’ on Echo of Moscow radio station. The show broadcasts every Tuesday at 9 PM, covering actual legal and political topics in Russia and includes educational material.

Political views and activities 
As a member of the Presidential Council for Civil Society and Human Rights, Schulmann contributed to the protection of the people accused under the  after 2019 Moscow protests. She publicly opposed their charges under civil disorder article No. 212 of the Russian Criminal Code, visited the arrested in detention centers and helped with legal defense in court.

When MSSES rector Sergey Zuev was arrested in October 2021, Schulmann publicly spoke out in his defense, signed a collective letter in his support and waited in front of the courthouse during sessions to show her support along with other Zuev's friends and colleagues.

On January 31, 2021, Schulmann's husband was detained during a protest rally in support of Alexey Navalny in Moscow.

After Russia began its invasion of Ukraine on 24 February 2022, Schulmann wrote about her opposition to the war.

On 12 April 2022, Schulmann announced that she was offered a fellowship by the Robert Bosch Stiftung and left Russia for Germany to work as an associate professor, stating that she was not moving indefinitely.

On 15 April 2022, the Russian justice ministry included her in the "foreign agents" list. As explained by Ekaterina, it means she cannot return to Russia because for a designated foreign agent, any public appearances and teaching are practically impossible.

Family 
She is married to Mikhail Schulmann, an expert on Vladimir Nabokov and a literary critic, whom she met on the Internet via LiveJournal.ru. The Schulmanns have three children (two daughters and a son) together.

Recognition 

According to Levada Center 2020 research, Schulmann was one of the most inspiring Russians to respondents between 40 and 55 years. Glamour magazine named her Woman of the Year in 2020. On April 13, 2021, she was awarded with a medal ‘For Developing State of Law’ by the Federal Chamber of Lawyers’.

Russian journalist Vladimir Guriev once jokingly said that he hoped Schulmann would be Russia's next president. Though Ekaterina herself refuses to have any ambition in that sphere, the slogan ‘Schulmann to presidency’ became popular on the Russian-speaking Internet.

In 2021, Oxxxymiron mentioned her in his rap song ("No milf is sexier than Ekaterina Schulmann"), which was widely discussed online. Schulmann herself declined to comment it.

Publications

Books
 Законотворчество как политический процесс (Legislation as a political process, 2014)
 Практическая политология: пособие по контакту с реальностью (Practical political science: A textbook on a contact with reality, 2015)

Research articles 
In English

Notes

References

External links 
 
 Official YouTube channel (in Russian, with some English-language content)

1978 births
Living people
Russian political scientists
Women political scientists
George Brown College alumni
Russian Presidential Academy of National Economy and Public Administration alumni
People from Tula, Russia
Russian YouTubers
Russian columnists
Russian women columnists
Russian opinion journalists
Echo of Moscow radio presenters
Russian activists against the 2022 Russian invasion of Ukraine
People listed in Russia as media foreign agents